Let It Come Down: The Life of Paul Bowles is a Canadian documentary film, directed by Jennifer Baichwal and released in 1998. The film is a portrait of American writer and composer Paul Bowles.

The film premiered at the 1998 Toronto International Film Festival.

The film received a Genie Award nomination for Best Feature Length Documentary at the 19th Genie Awards, and won the International Emmy Award for Best Arts Documentary at the 27th International Emmy Awards.

References

External links
 

1998 films
1998 documentary films
1998 LGBT-related films
Canadian documentary films
Canadian LGBT-related films
Films directed by Jennifer Baichwal
Documentary films about writers
Male bisexuality in film
Documentary films about classical music and musicians
1990s English-language films
1990s Canadian films